Angel of Babylon is the fifth full-length album by Tobias Sammet's rock opera German project Avantasia, released on 3 April 2010, along with The Wicked Symphony. Angel Of Babylon was released both as part of a box set, with the two albums combined and as an individual album. It is the third and final part of "The Wicked Trilogy".

Track listing

Personnel
 Tobias Sammet - lead vocals, bass guitar, keyboards
 Sascha Paeth - guitars, keyboards, producer
 Eric Singer - drums (on tracks 5, 7, 9, 10)
 Miro - keyboards, orchestration

Guests

Musicians
Guitars
Bruce Kulick (on tracks 5, 9, 11)
Oliver Hartmann (on tracks 1, 2, 3)
Henjo Richter (on track 10)
Drums
Felix Bohnke (on tracks 4, 6, 8)
Alex Holzwarth (on tracks 1, 2, 3, 11)
Keyboards
Jens Johansson (on track 2)
Organ
Simon Oberender (on track 9)

Singers
 Jørn Lande (on tracks 1, 2, 5, 6, 9, 10)
 Russell Allen (on tracks 1, 11)
 Michael Kiske (on track 1)
 Jon Oliva (on track 4)
 Bob Catley (on track 11)
 Cloudy Yang (on track 8)

References

Avantasia albums
2010 albums
Rock operas
Nuclear Blast albums